Interprofessional education (also known as inter-professional education or “IPE”) refers to occasions when students from two or more professions in health and social care learn together during all or part of their professional training with the object of cultivating collaborative practice for providing client- or patient-centered health care.

Overview
Interprofessional learning involves students learning from students from other professions, as well as learning with students from other professions, for example in the classroom, and learning about other professions. Interprofessional learning and teaching can take place at an academic institution, but also regularly occurs in workplace environments where students gain applicable and practical experience.

Associated terms include "multi-professional education", "common learning", "shared learning", and "interdisciplinary learning." In contrast to multiprofessional education interprofessional education involves interactive learning focused on active collaboration. It is primarily used in the domains of health and social care, where collaborative and patient-centred practice are expected to improve the effectiveness of health care and the quality of life of health & social service users.

There is debate about the effectiveness of interprofessional education in enabling collaborative practice. Research and systematic reviews continue to identify some evidence of effectiveness in changing attitudes.  But more empirical evidence of longer term impact is needed, particularly in respect of effects on service quality and service users’ and patients’ experience. Nevertheless, more evaluations of IPE have been conducted than for many other commonly accepted educational approaches.

WHO Study Group and World Committee on Interprofessional Education & Collaborative Practice
Recognizing the importance of interprofessional education as one of the innovative approaches that can help tackle the global health workforce challenge, the World Health Organization (WHO) convened a WHO Study Group on Interprofessional Education & Collaborative Practice in 2007 to articulate a greater understanding of this issue within a global context. It was tasked with providing guidance to Member States on how they could use interprofessional collaboration to scale-up and build more flexible health workforces that enable local health needs to be met efficiently and effectively while maximizing resources.

The WHO Study Group engaged various partners and undertook a program of work that culminated in the publication of WHO’s Framework for Action on Interprofessional Education and Collaborative Practice in March 2010. The Framework highlights the current status of interprofessional collaboration around the world, identifies the mechanisms that shape successful collaborative teamwork, and outlines a series of action items that policymakers can apply within their local health system. It provides strategies and ideas that can help health policymakers implement the elements of interprofessional education and collaborative practice that will be most beneficial in their own jurisdiction.

The WHO Study Group consisted of almost 30 top education, practice and policy experts from across every region of the world. Overall leadership was provided by Co-Chairs Prof. John HV Gilbert (University of British Columbia & Canadian Interprofessional Health Collaborative) and Dr. Jean Yan (World Health Organization) and a secretariat led by Mr. Steven J. Hoffman (World Health Organization). This led to a report describing the necessity to act on changes in (higher) education and in clinical institutions to implement and secure interprofessional collaborative practice.

Partners included the following organizations:
Australasian Interprofessional Practice and Education Network
Canadian Interprofessional Health Collaborative
European Interprofessional Practice and Education Network
International Association for Interprofessional Education and Collaborative Practice
Journal of Interprofessional Care
National Health Sciences Students’ Association, Canada
Nordic Interprofessional Network
The Network: Towards Unity for Health
UK Centre for the Advancement of Interprofessional Education

Since 2012 a World Committee is active, supervising the biennial All Together Better Health (ATBH) Conferences and overarching the regional networks around the world. The management structure of this World Committee was restructured in 2015, with Prof. Andre Vyt serving as first chair.
World Committee All Together Better Health

Medical school curriculum
Interprofessional education (IPE) is becoming a more common component of medical school curriculum in the United States. IPE programs have existed transiently at various schools since the 1960s, but interprofessional education programs are growing, as they are increasingly viewed as a means of reducing medical errors and improving the health care system.  The following medical schools currently have interprofessional programs as a part of their curriculum:

 Linköping University
 University of Washington
 University of Nebraska Medical Center
 Northeast Ohio Medical University
 Oregon Health & Science University
University of Colorado Anschutz Medical Campus
 University of Illinois College of Medicine
 University of Minnesota
 University of Oklahoma Health Sciences Center
 University of South Florida College of Medicine
 University of Virginia School of Medicine
 Vanderbilt University School of Medicine
 Virginia Commonwealth University School of Medicine
 Virginia Tech Carilion School of Medicine
 Western University of Health Sciences
 Yale University School of Medicine
 University of Arizona
 University of Kansas 
Des Moines University
 Rosalind Franklin University of Medicine and Science
 College of Osteopathic Medicine, Nova Southeastern University
 University of Iowa Carver College of Medicine
 Saint Louis University
 University of Missouri–Kansas City School of Medicine
 University of Missouri-Columbia
 Florida Atlantic University Charles E. Schmidt College of Medicine
 A.T.Still University
 University of Texas Medical Branch/UTMB Health 
 Lebanese American University 
D'Youville College

See also
Health Human Resources
Journal of Interprofessional Care

References

 Centers of Excellence in Primary Care Education (2017). Compendium of Five Case Studies: Lessons for Interprofessional Teamwork in Education and Workplace Learning Environments 2011-2016 (S. Gilman & L. Traylor Eds.): United States Department of Veterans Affairs, Office of Academic Affiliations.

External links

Resources and organisations:
University of Virginia Center for Interprofessional Education (ASPIRE)
Center for Health Science Interprofessional Education, Research and Practice
The National Center for Interprofessional Practice and Education
University of Nebraska Medical Center 2013 IPE Annual Report
CIHC: Canadian Interprofessional Health Collaborative
CIHC Library - A repository of interprofessional health and education materials
CAIPE: Centre for the Advancement of Interprofessional Education
EIPEN: European Interprofessional Education Network
Journal of Interprofessional Care
Interprofessional Education and Practice, University of Arizona
APTR Healthy People Curriculum Taskforce
Journal of Research in Interprofessional Practice and Education
Department of Veterans Affairs, Office of Academic Affiliations
: Department of Veterans Affairs, Office of Academic Affiliations, Centers of Excellence in Primary Care Education
[https://www.va.gov/oaa/apact : Department of Veterans Affairs, Office of Academic Affiliations, Interprofessional Academic Patient Aligned Care Team (iAPACT))

Philosophy of education
Health care quality
Medical treatments
World Health Organization